The non-avian reptiles of Australia are a diverse group of animals, widely distributed across the continent. Three of the four reptile orders are represented: Testudines, Squamata and Crocodilia. The only missing extant order is Sphenodontia, containing the tuataras, which are endemic to New Zealand. Australia has over 860 species, a large number in comparison to other continents; for example, North America's total is about 280. The most species-rich group is Squamata, the snakes and lizards. They are especially diverse in the arid areas of Australia, where other fauna are scarcer. Spinifex grass is a major habitat which allows them to remain in a relatively cool, moist area.

Australia has a large array of reptiles which can be dangerous to humans. The world's largest reptile, the saltwater crocodile (Crocodylus porosus), is native to the continent's north coastal area.

Australian reptile families

See also
 List of reptiles of Tasmania
 List of reptiles of Western Australia
 List of Australian and Antarctic dinosaurs

References

 Harold G. Cogger. Reptiles and Amphibians of Australia. Sydney, AH & AW Reed. Revised edition, 1983.  [1979 and subsequent editions]
 Harold G. Cogger. Reptiles and Amphibians of Australia. CSIRO Publishing, Melbourne. Revised edition 2014. 
 
 

 Australia